Scotch most commonly refers to:
 Scotch (adjective), a largely obsolescent adjective meaning "of or from Scotland"
Scotch, old-fashioned name for the indigenous languages of the Scottish people:
Scots language ("Broad Scotch")
 Scottish Gaelic ("Scotch Gaelic")
 Scotch whisky, a whisky made in Scotland, which outside Scotland is commonly abbreviated as "Scotch"

Scotch may also refer to:

Places
Scotch Corner, a junction of the A1 road and the A66 road in North Yorkshire, England

Art, entertainment, and media
Scotch (band), an Italian disco/pop group during the 1980s
Hopscotch, a children's game
Scotch Game, a chess opening

Brands and enterprises
Scotch, a brand name used by 3M until 1996 for recordable media, such as audio cassettes and video cassettes
Scotch Tape, a commercial brand name for a type of adhesive tape made by 3M

Food and drink
Butterscotch, a confectionery
Scotch ale, a type of strong ale found in Scotland and North East England
Scotch Beef, beef from suckler cattle in Scotland with EU Protected Geographical Status
Scotch broth, a soup made with mutton, barley, leeks, peas, carrots and swedes (rutabagas)
Scotch egg, a hard boiled egg served wrapped in sausage meat and breadcrumbs, and fried
Scotch pancake, a small, sweet pancake
Scotch pie, a small, double-crust meat pie filled with minced mutton or other meat

Materials and goods 
Scotch, a wedge used to prevent railway vehicles moving in clip and scotch
Scotch gauge, a narrow gauge of railway used in Scotland and Japan
Scotch key, pins inserted into holes drilled axially to fix an item such as a gear onto a shaft

Typography 
Scotch Roman is a class of 19th century typefaces

Computing 
The Scotch and PT-Scotch software for Graph partitioning

Other uses 
Scotch College (disambiguation), several private schools associated with the Presbyterian Church and/or the Uniting Church, in Australia
Scotch Mist (disambiguation)

See also 
Scots (disambiguation)
Scottish (disambiguation)

Language and nationality disambiguation pages